Duke of Talavera de la Reina, commonly known as Duke of Talavera, is a title of Spanish nobility that is accompanied by the dignity of Grandee of Spain. It was granted to María Luisa de Silva y Fernández de Henestrosa on 25 September 1914 by king Alfonso XIII as a result of her marriage to Infante Fernando of Bavaria. The king, who held great affection for her, made her Infanta of Spain on 17 May 1927, to date, the only exception of a member of a non-dynastic family becoming an Infante.

Dukes of Talavera de la Reina
 María Luisa de Silva y Fernández de Henestrosa, 1st Duchess of Talavera (1914–1955)

See also
List of dukes in the peerage of Spain
List of current Grandees of Spain

References 

Dukedoms of Spain
Grandees of Spain
Lists of dukes
Lists of Spanish nobility